The Men's 20 km Race Walking event at the 2003 Pan American Games took place on Tuesday August 5, 2003. Ecuador's Jefferson Pérez regained the title he lost four years earlier to Bernardo Segura. The title defender from Mexico ended up in second place this time.

Medalists

Records

Results

See also
2003 Race Walking Year Ranking
2003 World Championships in Athletics – Men's 20 kilometres walk
Athletics at the 2004 Summer Olympics – Men's 20 kilometre walk

References
Results

Walk, Men's 20
2003